Fly Salone was an airline based in the United Kingdom that operated scheduled and charter flights between London and Freetown, Sierra Leone. The airline conducted its first flight on 11 December 2015. On 17 March 2016, Fly Salone announced it had ceased trading and operated its last flight the following day.

History 
Fly Salone was created in response to British Airways' suspension of nonstop flights from London Heathrow Airport to Freetown in August 2014, in the wake of the Ebola virus epidemic in West Africa. In November 2015 the World Health Organization declared Sierra Leone free of Ebola, and in early December the UK Civil Aviation Authority lifted its ban on flights to the country.

The airline was registered in the United Kingdom but served as the flag carrier of Sierra Leone. The management team was entirely Sierra Leonean.

On 11 December 2015, the airline operated its first flight, departing London Gatwick Airport at night and arriving in Freetown Lungi International Airport the following morning. Flights operated twice a week using a Boeing 757 leased from Icelandair.

On 17 March 2016, Fly Salone announced it had ceased trading and would soon go into liquidation. No reasons were provided. The airline operated its final flight, from Freetown to London, the following day.  The collapse of Fly Salone also caused the UK travel operator Kevin McPhillips Travel to cease trading.  McPhillips Travel had been behind most direct flight operations between the UK and Sierra Leone for more than 20 years.

Destinations 

At the time it ceased operations, Fly Salone was flying to the following destinations:

Fleet 
Prior to its collapse, Fly Salone operated a single Boeing 757-200 aircraft, leased from Icelandair.

See also
 Transport in Sierra Leone
 List of defunct airlines of the United Kingdom

References

External links
 , archived 20 February 2016
 McPhillips Travel website, archived 7 April 2015

Defunct airlines of the United Kingdom
Defunct airlines of Sierra Leone
Airlines established in 2015
Airlines disestablished in 2016
British companies established in 2015